A Henley shirt is a collarless pullover shirt, characterized by a round neckline and a placket about  long and usually having 2–5 buttons. It essentially is a collarless polo shirt. The sleeves may be either short or long, and it can be made in almost any fabric, although cotton, cotton-polyester blends, and thermals are by far the most popular. Henley shirts are generally regarded as menswear, but women's versions have appeared as business casual and casual wear as well.

History
Henley shirts were named because they were the traditional uniform of rowers in the English town of Henley-on-Thames.  The first Henley Royal Regatta was in 1839.

In his biography of Ralph Lauren, the journalist Michael Gross quotes a New York merchant who recalled showing a vintage shirt to a Ralph Lauren buyer: "I showed this fellow underwear—a three-button long-sleeve shirt by Johnstown Knitting Mills. He said, 'This is a new shirt.' That's where he got the idea for the Henley shirt."

References

Shirts
Tops (clothing)